Étienne Pierre Ventenat (1 March 1757 – 13 August 1808) was a French botanist born in Limoges. He was the brother of naturalist Louis Ventenat (1765–1794).

While employed as director of the ecclesiastic library Sainte-Geneviève in Paris, Ventenat took a trip to England. Here he investigated the country's botanical gardens, inspiring him to pursue a vocation in sciences. Following his time at library he became an active botanist, studying under and collaborating with botanist Charles Louis L'Héritier de Brutelle (1746–1800). In 1795 he was elected a member of the Institut national des sciences et des arts, later known as the Académie des sciences.

In 1794 he wrote a treatise on the principles of botany titled Principes de botanique, expliqués au Lycée républicain par Ventenat. After publication he became so disappointed with its mediocrity that he reportedly made efforts to procure all copies of the book and have them destroyed. In 1798 he published a French translation of Antoine-Laurent de Jussieu's Genera plantarum as Tableau du règne végétal selon la méthode de Jussieu. In his translation of the work, Ventenat added information involving the properties and uses of plants.

In 1799 he published Description des plantes nouvelles et peu connues, cultivées dans le jardin de J.-M. Cels, a work that described flora in the botanical garden of Jacques Philippe Martin Cels (1740–1806), and in 1803 he published Le Jardin de la Malmaison, being written at the request of Joséphine de Beauharnais (1763–1814), who wished to immortalize the rare species of plants found in the gardens and greenhouses of Château de Malmaison. The illustrations in the two aforementioned works were performed by famed botanical artist Pierre-Joseph Redouté (1759–1840). Ventenat is also credited with continuing the work on Jean Baptiste François Pierre Bulliard's Histoire des champignons de la France, a landmark work on mushrooms native to France.

Works 

 Principes de botanique : expliqués au Lycée républicain 1792
 
 Vol. I Discours sur l'étude de la botanique p. i, Dictionaire de botanique p. 1, Nomenclature méthodique p. 579
 Vol. II Acotylédones p. 1, Monocotylédones p. 75, Dicotylédones p. 225
 Vol. III Dicotylédones (continued: Class 12 Polypetales onwards) Schema p. 139
 Description des plantes nouvelles et peu connues, cultivées dans le jardin de J.-M. Cels, 1799
 Choix de plantes : dont la plupart sont cultivées dans le jardin de Cels 1803
 
 Decas Generum Novorum, 1808.

References

Bibliography 

 This article was originally based on a translation of the equivalent article at the French Wikipedia
 Adrien Davy de Virville (dir.),Histoire de la botanique en France, SEDES, Paris, 1955 : 394 p.
 H. Walter Lack, Un Jardin d’Eden. Chefs-d’œuvre de l’illustration botanique, Taschen, Cologne, 2001 : 576 p.
 William Wheeler, L'Illustration botanique, Les Éditions du Carrousel, Paris, 1999 : 175 p.

External links 
 The Eponym Dictionary of Southern African Plants Plant Names T-Z ventenatii/ventenatiana
 

French taxonomists
1757 births
1808 deaths
Members of the French Academy of Sciences
People from Limoges
19th-century French botanists
18th-century French botanists